Parandak may refer to:

 Parandak, Markazi, a city in Markazi Province, Iran
 Parandak, Tehran, a village in Tehran Province, Iran